The Christian Labour Confederation (KOK) is a trade union centre in the Czech Republic. It is affiliated with the International Trade Union Confederation.

References

External links
Christian Labour Confederation (KOK) website
former, outdated website

Trade unions in the Czech Republic
International Trade Union Confederation